Krasnoselsky (masculine), Krasnoselskaya (feminine), or Krasnoselskoye (neuter) is the name of several inhabited localities in Russia.

Urban localities
Krasnoselsky, Krasnodar Krai, an urban-type settlement in Gulkevichsky District of Krasnodar Krai

Rural localities
Krasnoselsky, Novosibirsk Oblast, a settlement in Karasuksky District of Novosibirsk Oblast
Krasnoselskoye, Kabardino-Balkarian Republic, a selo in Prokhladnensky District of the Kabardino-Balkarian Republic
Krasnoselskoye, name of several other rural localities

See also
Zheleznodorozhnoy stantsii Krasnoselskaya, a village in Ivanovsky District of Ivanovo Oblast
Krasnoye Selo (inhabited locality)